The Garfield Building was located at 26 Court Street and Remsen Street in Brooklyn, New York. It was built by contractor William Lamb, who was originally from Glasgow, Scotland. Together with
his brother Thomas, the builders began their careers with the firm W&T Lamb, starting in 1861. The seven-story Garfield Building was offered in an auction by the Brooklyn Real Estate Exchange in January 1906. The lot covered 100 feet by 137.6 feet. It was near Borough Hall, the court house, Temple Bar, Hall of Records, the first subway station, and the heart of the financial center.

History of edifice

In the late 19th century the structure often served as a meeting place for railroad officials and the Brooklyn Republican Campaign Committee. Colonel Charles L. Fincke, of the 23rd Regiment of the United States National Guard, maintained an office at the Garfield Building. He was found unconscious there prior to resigning in April 1887. It also was home to lawyers.

The Garfield Building was located in the rear of a building at 198 Montague Street, which burned following an explosion of unknown origin, on March 3, 1895. The conflagration occurred inside a four-story edifice which was occupied by a restaurant and cafe'.

Demolition
The Garfield building was razed after a period of building inactivity following World War I. City departments were moved to a new Municipal Building and the Court Remsen Building. The latter was completed on May 1, 1925.

References

1925 disestablishments in New York (state)
History of Brooklyn
Demolished buildings and structures in Brooklyn
Cultural history of New York City